The Annals of the Kingdom of Ireland or the Annals of the Four Masters (Annála na gCeithre Máistrí) are chronicles of medieval Irish history. The entries span from the Deluge, dated as 2,242 years after creation to AD 1616.

Publication delay
Due to the criticisms by 17th century Irish historian Tuileagna Ó Maol Chonaire, the text was not published in the lifetimes of any of the participants.

Text
 
The annals are mainly a compilation of earlier annals, although there is some original work. They were compiled between 1632 and 1636, allegedly in a cottage beside the ruins of Donegal Abbey, just outside Donegal Town. At this time, however, the Franciscans had a house of refuge by the River Drowes in County Leitrim, just outside Ballyshannon, and it was here, according to others, that the Annals were compiled. The patron of the project was Fearghal Ó Gadhra, MP, a Gaelic lord in Coolavin, County Sligo.

The chief compiler of the annals was Brother Mícheál Ó Cléirigh from Ballyshannon, who was assisted by, among others, Cú Choigcríche Ó Cléirigh, Fearfeasa Ó Maol Chonaire and Cú Choigríche Ó Duibhgeannáin. Although only one of the authors, Mícheál Ó Cléirigh, was a Franciscan friar, they became known as "the Four Friars" or in the original Irish, . The Anglicized version of this was "the Four Masters", the name that has become associated with the annals themselves.

The annals are written in Irish. The several manuscript copies are held at Trinity College Dublin, the Royal Irish Academy, University College Dublin, and the National Library of Ireland.

Translation
The first substantial English translation (starting at AD 1171) was published by Owen Connellan in 1846. The Connellan translation included the annals from the eleventh to the seventeenth centuries.  The only version to have a four-colour frontispiece, it included a large folding map showing the location of families in Ireland. This edition, neglected for over 150 years, was republished in the early twenty-first century. The original Connellan translation was followed in the 1850s by a full translation by the historian John O'Donovan. The translation was funded by a government grant of £1,000 obtained by the notable mathematician Sir William Rowan Hamilton while he was president of the Royal Irish Academy.

The Annals are one of the principal Irish-language sources for Irish history up to 1616. While many of the early chapters are essentially lists of names and dates, the later chapters, dealing with events of which the authors had first-hand accounts, are much more detailed.

Importance
As a historical source, the Annals are largely limited to the accounts of the births, deaths and activities of the Gaelic nobility of Ireland and the wider social trends or events are up for contemporary historians to establish.

On the other hand, the Annals, as one of the few prose sources in Irish from this period, also provide a valuable insight into events such as the Desmond Rebellions and the Nine Years War from a Gaelic Irish perspective.

The early part of this work is based upon the Lebor Gabála.  Today, most scholars regard the Lebor Gabála as primarily myth rather than history. It appears to be mostly based on medieval Christian pseudo-histories, but it also incorporates some of Ireland's native pagan mythology. Scholars believe the goal of its writers was to provide an epic history for Ireland that could compare to that of the Israelites or the Romans, and which reconciled native myth with the Christian view of history. It is suggested, for example, that there are six 'takings' to match the Six Ages of the World. Medievalist academic Mark Williams  writes of Lebor Gabála Érenn that it is a "highly influential Middle Irish prose-and-verse treatise [...] written in order to bridge the chasm between Christian world-chronology and the prehistory of Ireland".

Editions and translations

, 7 volumes, Royal Irish Academy:
: English, Irish
: English, Irish
: English, Irish
: English, Irish
: English, Irish
: English, Irish *

* The appendix of volume 6 contains pedigrees of a small selection of the Gaelic Irish nobility, pp. 2377 ff.

See also
 Irish annals
 The Chronicle of Ireland
 Template:Cite AFM for citing the Annal in articles at Wikipedia

References

Further reading

External links
Catholic Encyclopedia: Annals of the Four Masters
List of Published Texts at CELT — University College Cork's Corpus of Electronic Texts project has the full text of the annals online, both in the original Irish and in O'Donovan's translation.
Irish Script On Screen — The ISOS project at the Dublin Institute for Advanced Studies has high-resolution digital images of the Royal Irish Academy's copy of the Annals.

1630s books
17th-century documents
17th-century history books
Donegal (town)
Irish chronicles
Irish texts
Irish-language literature